Battala woodcut prints are the woodcut relief prints produced in the Battala region of Calcutta. Although woodblock printing on fabrics has been in India for centuries, the paper adaptation of woodblock  printing appeared relatively late, because of the late entry and early exit due to advent of lithography the Battala woodcut printing had a remarkably short run. The Battala woodcuts were printed on a very cheap newsprint like paper to keep the cost of these prints low. Because of the short run, cheap paper and humid conditions of the region very few of these prints have survived.

History
In the early 19th Century, the Battala area became known for the prints, which typically had a religious or mystical theme. They made their first appearance in the 1820s as book illustrations;  by the mid nineteenth century printmakers started printing the smaller prints, which often represented Kalighat paintings.

Demand for the prints began to decline with the introduction of  color lithography printing.

References

Woodcuts
Relief printing